Come into My Life is the debut studio album by Italian dance music singer Gala, released in November 1997. The album was recorded at the Planet Studio in Milan, Italy.
Four singles were released: "Come into My Life", "Freed from Desire", "Suddenly" and "Let a Boy Cry".

Reception

The UK channel 4 teletext page 'Planet Sound' gave the album 3 out of 5, praising Gala for the "surprising variety". Of the few high-profile reviews available to read online, the AllMusic review by Dean Carlson awarded the album 1.5 stars stating "Gala was one of the first pop stars to graft a classical Italian outlook onto old-school acid techno. With a past including art school and a name taken from Salvador Dalí's wife, Gala's background contrasted sharply with the Dubstar dance-pop of hits like "Let a Boy Cry" and "Freed From Desire" as well as her slightly androgynous good looks and flat, nasal singing style.

The Gipsy Kings' Tonino Baliardo appeared on "Summer Eclipse", and the title track is a delightful second summer-of-love jam, but Gala lacked confidence and range."

Track listing

Personnel 

Tonino Baliardo – guitar, guitar arrangements
Gala – arranger, mixing, vocals
Maurizio Molella – arranger, mixing, producer
Phil Jay – arranger, mixing, producer

Chart performance

References

External links
Gala Rizzatto's Official Site
 

Gala (singer) albums
1997 debut albums